An ammunition ship is an auxiliary ship specially configured to carry ammunition, usually for naval ships and aircraft. An ammunition ship's cargo handling systems, designed with extreme safety in mind, include ammunition hoists with airlocks between decks, and mechanisms for flooding entire compartments with sea water in case of emergencies. Ammunition ships most often deliver their cargo to other ships using underway replenishment, using both connected replenishment and vertical replenishment. To a lesser extent, they transport ammunition from one shore-based weapons station to another.

In the United States Navy 
U.S. Navy ammunition ships are frequently named for volcanos.

During World War II, U.S. Navy ammunition ships were converted from merchant ships or specially built on merchant ship hulls, often of Type C2. They were armed, and were manned by naval crews. The ship disintegrated in seconds with the loss of all hands.

They are unarmed and are manned by civilian crews. These ships are being replaced by the s.

References 

Ship types
Auxiliary ships